Bánh rế is a Vietnamese street food made from sweet potatoes. The sweet potato is made into a pancake, deep-fried, then sugared. It is associated with the Bình Thuận area.

Color variants  
Bánh rế has 2 color variants:
 Reddish brown, which resembles that of cockroach wings.

 Yellow: This variant is made of sweet potato and tapioca, with a golden color similar to that of honey.

References

Pancakes
Street food in Vietnam
Bánh
Potato dishes
Deep fried foods